The Florida State League Most Valuable Player Award (MVP), known as the Player of the Year Award until 2021, is an annual award given to the best player in minor league baseball's Florida State League.

First basemen, with 6 winners, have won the most among infielders, followed by second basemen (1). Two catchers has also won the award. Nine outfielders have won the MVP Award.

Three players from the Bradenton Marauders, St. Lucie Mets, and Tampa Yankees have been selected for the MVP Award, more than any other teams in the league, followed by the Daytona Cubs/Tortugas and Jupiter Hammerheads (2); and the Charlotte Stone Crabs, Clearwater Threshers Dunedin Blue Jays, Fort Myers Miracle, and Lakeland Tigers (1).

Three players from the New York Mets, New York Yankees, and Pittsburgh Pirates Major League Baseball (MLB) organizations have won the MVP Award, more than any others, followed by the Florida Marlins organization (2); and the Chicago Cubs, Cincinnati Reds, Detroit Tigers, Minnesota Twins, Philadelphia Phillies, Tampa Bay Rays, and Toronto Blue Jays organizations (1).

Key

Winners

References
General

Specific

Florida State League
Minor league baseball trophies and awards
Minor league baseball MVP award winners
Awards established in 2004